Mike's Weather Page is a weather website established in 2004 by blogger Mike Boylan.

Background
The website was launched in 2004 by Mike Boylan. He graduated from the University of South Florida with a degree in marketing in 1996. He joined Facebook in 2009 to establish his weather site and has since amassed over one million followers, becoming a popular figure in the weather blogging realm. Boylan is also well-known for his live coverage of Atlantic hurricanes as a storm chaser.

The website provides a wide range of information related to weather and climate. Analysis and forecasts of tropical cyclogenesis can be found on the site.

Recognition
Mike's Weather Page has been acknowledged by the National Oceanic and Atmospheric Administration, the National Weather Service, the Centers for Disease Control and Prevention, and the Federal Emergency Management Agency. It has served as a source for weather analysis by hurricane hunters, meteorologists, state emergency management entities, The Weather Channel, and government officials. Veteran meteorologist Jim Cantore once called Boylan's site a "one-stop shop for weather."

In 2021, Florida Governor Ron DeSantis honored Boylan with the Tropical Meteorology Award for his site's focus on weather coverage during Atlantic hurricane seasons.

Awards
 Governor's Hurricane Conference Tropical Meteorology Award (2021)

References

External Links
 
 Official Twitter
 Official Facebook

Meteorological data and networks
Internet properties established in 2004